The Criminal Cases Review Commission (CCRC) is the statutory body responsible for investigating alleged miscarriages of justice in England, Wales, and Northern Ireland. It was established by Section 8 of the Criminal Appeal Act 1995 and began work on 31 March 1997. The commission is the only body in its area of jurisdiction with the power to send a case back to an appeals court if it concludes that there is a real possibility that the court will overturn a conviction or reduce a sentence. Since starting work in 1997, it has on average referred 33 cases a year for appeal.

Responsibilities 
From 31 March 1997 to 30 September 2017, the commission referred 634 cases back to appeals courts, or almost one case for every eight working days (see casework statistics below). Those referrals came from a total of 21,780 cases closed during that period, meaning that the commission has referred for appeal around 2.91% of the applications it has considered. Of the cases it has referred, approximately 66.1% have succeeded on appeal.

The cases referred for appeal by the commission tend to come from the most serious end of the criminal spectrum; just over 25% of referrals have been for murder convictions, almost 12% have been for rapes, and 8% have been for robberies. The rest relate to a mixture of other offences, mostly serious and indictable-only.

The Criminal Appeal Act 1995, which created the commission, requires it to consider applications regarding convictions from both the Crown Court and magistrates' courts. About 90% of all applications received, and 95% of the commission's referrals, relate to Crown Court cases for which the appellate court is the Court of Appeal. Magistrates' court cases are appealed in the Crown Court.

The commission currently receives around 1,500 applications a year. Applications are made in writing by people with criminal convictions or by their representatives. It is not necessary to have a lawyer to apply to the commission, but around half of all applicants are assisted by a lawyer.
 
Applications can relate to a conviction, a sentence, or both. Around 85% of the commission's referrals relate to convictions, and 15% to sentences. A small handful of cases have been referred for both conviction and sentence.

The commission is essentially a post-appeal organisation, and applicants to it almost always need to have appealed, or at least sought leave to appeal, before the commission can agree to review their case. In some cases, where there are exceptional circumstances, the commission can review a case in the absence of a prior attempt to appeal.

In order to refer a case for appeal, the commission usually has to identify new evidence or a new legal argument that makes the case look significantly different. This evidence or argument must not have been considered at the time of the trial, at the initial appeal, or in an earlier application to the commission. Again, there is an "exceptional circumstances" caveat that allows the commission to refer cases with no new evidence or argument, but such instances are extremely rare.

In 2009, the commission's jurisdiction was extended to cover convictions and sentences arising from the Court Martial or Service Civilian Court.

The commission was the subject of a Justice Select Committee inquiry from 2014–15. The inquiry received 47 written submissions and took oral evidence from 14 people.

The commission is an independent non-departmental public body funded by way of a cash grant from the Ministry of Justice. It is based in Birmingham and has around 90 staff members, plus Commissioners. Its budget for 2016–17 was around £5.4 million.

Scotland has its own legal system, and there is a separate Scottish CCRC.

Casework statistics 
The CCRC started work in April 1997. Between then and the end of November 2019 it has:

Referred 676 cases

Of the 658 cases where appeals have been heard by the courts, 442 appeals have been allowed and 203 dismissed

593 cases are currently under review at the Commission and 138 are awaiting consideration.

So far we have received a total of 25,819 applications (including all ineligible cases) and completed 25,087 cases.

The difference between the total number of CCRC referrals heard by the appeal courts and the number of outcomes recorded is accounted for by cases where the appeal proceedings have been heard but the judgement is awaited and a number of cases that were referred by the CCRC but the appeal was abandoned.

CCRC casework statistics and other performance related data are regularly updated here.

Background 
Before the creation of the CCRC, the only resort for a case that had already been to the Court of Appeal (or the Northern Ireland Court of Appeal) was a direct appeal to the Home Secretary or the Secretary of State for Northern Ireland. Only these officials had the power to order the court to hear a case again. This power was limited to cases tried on indictment, and only four or five cases were referred each year from around 700 applications. The power was also reactive in that the secretary could only considered the issues raised by applicants or their representatives, and could not investigate further or seek new grounds for appeal. A source of frequent criticism was that the same person responsible for the police could control whether or not a conviction was overturned.
 
In the 1970s, a series of convictions were later found to be illegitimate: those of the Guildford Four (1974), the Birmingham Six (1975), the Maguire Seven (1976), and Judith Ward (1974). These cases featured a mixture of false confessions, police misconduct, non-disclosure, and unreliable expert forensic testimony. An additional factor affecting the decision-making during the investigation and prosecution of these cases was their high public profile, resulting in pressure to obtain convictions and restore public confidence.

The weaknesses in the criminal justice system exposed by these cases led to the establishment of a Royal Commission on Criminal Justice in 1991. Its mandate included considering whether changes were needed in the arrangements for considering and investigating allegations of miscarriages of justice when appeal rights have been exhausted. Evidence was gathered over a two-year period. The Royal Commission published its report in July 1993. It concluded (adopting the view expressed by Sir John May in his inquiry into the Guildford and Woolwich bombings) that the arrangements for referring cases back to the courts were incompatible with the constitutional separation of judicial and executive powers. The recommendations of the Royal Commission led to the Criminal Appeal Act of 1995, which established the Criminal Cases Review Commission.

The CCRC has been criticized for the length of time it takes to examine cases and the way it produces its statistics. Bob Woffinden wrote in The Guardian in 2010 that the Commission counts as a "quashed case" any case it refers on the basis of sentence alone if the sentence is subsequently changed, and any case in which alternative convictions are upheld. He also wrote that the Commission counts its successes in terms of individual people rather than cases, so that CCRC referrals where the convictions of more than one person are overturned are counted more than once. He has also said that some of the CCRC's work involves overturning relatively minor convictions; according to Woffinden, between 2005 and 2010, the commission referred only seven major cases to the Court of Appeal, including one (the case of Sean Hodgson) in which the prisoner's lawyers worked directly with the police and prosecution to secure an uncontested appeal. The commission's response to this criticism was to refer to its case work statistics which show, as mentioned above, that just over 25% of its more than 600 referrals have been for murder convictions, almost 12% have been for rapes, and 8% have been for robberies and the rest relate to a mixture of other offences, mostly serious and indictable-only.

The first governing body was composed of a Board of 15 Commission Members. The first Chairman was Sir Frederick Crawford, a declared freemason. Four  members had a police or prosecution background.

Criticism
In 2018, Jon Robins wrote in the New Law Journal that the commission had been underfunded by the government's austerity measures, noting that for every £10 that the commission could spend on cases in 2008, it now only has £4, and it referred only 12 cases to the Court of Appeal in 2017. The CCRC received £7 million from the MoJ in 2003/4 and £6.5 million in 2009/10. In 2017/18 its income dropped to £5.6 million.  Applications to the commission have increased, from 885 in 2003/4 to 1,439 in 2017/18.  It is feared that cuts to legal aid and failure to disclose evidence have increased the risk of miscarriages of justice so the commission is more needed than it was in the past.

See also
Scottish Criminal Cases Review Commission
Simon Hall – murderer whose case was referred to the Court of Appeal by the CCRC in 2009, only for him to go on to confess to his crime

Notes

External links
 
Guide to making applications to the CCRC from United Against Injustice
The Criminal Cases Review Commission: Hope for the Innocent?

Ministry of Justice
Non-departmental public bodies of the United Kingdom government
Law enforcement in England and Wales
Law enforcement in Northern Ireland
English criminal law
Criminal law of Northern Ireland
Legal error